Sharbithat is a coastal town in Dhofar, Oman. Sharbithat is situated around 430 km from Salalah, which is in the south of Sultanate of Oman.

Characteristics
Sharbithat is basically a fishing village, having a population of approximately 300 people. Fish caught from Sharbithat is sent to places like Dubai and Salalah, where it is packaged and exported to many countries. Sharbithat has a secondary school and a health center. A new housing colony has recently been built.

Populated places in Oman
Populated coastal places in Oman

Archeology 
The 14-km coastline of Sharbithat is a promising site of excavation for Neolithic sites; the first dig was conducted in January 2017. In 2020, a tooth from a species of Otodus, an extinct genus of shark, dating back 5500 years was found. The tooth was the first of its kind found in Arabia.

References